Kamen Ivanchev Donev (born 15 April 1971) is a Bulgarian actor, film director, dramaturgist, and choreographer.

Donev studied acting at NATFIZ, graduating in 1993. Between 1994 and 2009, he was an actor in the Bulgarian Army Theatre (Bulgarian: Театър „Българска армия“). In 2000 and 2001, Donev was part of the cast of the TV show "The Street" (Bulgarian: Улицата), which was directed by Tedy Moskov. He is well-known for his comic sketches.

References

External links
 

1971 births
20th-century Bulgarian male actors
21st-century Bulgarian male actors
Bulgarian male film actors
Bulgarian male stage actors
Bulgarian film directors
Bulgarian comedians
Living people
People from Ruse, Bulgaria